The VEF I-14 was a Latvian Air Force trainer aircraft prototype, built by VEF.

Design and development 
Kārlis Irbītis began work on the I-14 in 1936 in response to an order placed by the Latvian Air Force for a new trainer aircraft.  Taking inspiration from Miles aircraft, the I-14 was a low-wing monoplane with fixed, conventional landing gear.  The single pilot sat in an enclosed cockpit.  It was powered by a 200 hp Menasco B6S Buccaneer.

Operational history 
The I-14 made its maiden flight on 19 November 1937.  On 23 April 1938, the aircraft was destroyed in a crash, its pilot, Bandenieks, was unhurt.  Development of the I-14 was abandoned in favor of the more advanced VEF I-15.

Specifications (I-14)

References 

1930s Latvian military trainer aircraft
Low-wing aircraft
Single-engined tractor aircraft
VEF aircraft